Jorritsma is a West Frisian patronymic surname ("Jorrit's son") that may refer to 

Aletta Jorritsma (born 1989), Dutch rower
Annemarie Jorritsma (born 1950), Dutch politician
Gerben Jorritsma (born 1993), Dutch speed skater
Hans Jorritsma (born 1949), Dutch Olympic field hockey player
John Jorritsma (born 1956), King's Commissioner of the Dutch province of Friesland
 (1945-2012), Dutch speed skater, coach and sports presenter

Patronymic surnames
Surnames of Frisian origin